The Cabinet of Gilgit-Baltistan is the cabinet of the government of Gilgit-Baltistan in Pakistan.  The cabinet consists of twelve ministers, two advisors, three special assistants to the chief minister, two coordinators, and the chief minister of Gilgit-Baltistan.

References 

Ministries of Pakistani provinces
Government of Gilgit-Baltistan